Glebionis is a small genus of flowering plants in the family Asteraceae, native to Europe and the Mediterranean region. The species were formerly treated in the genus Chrysanthemum, but a 1999 ruling of the International Botanical Congress has resulted in that genus being redefined to cover the species related to the economically important florist's chrysanthemum, thereby excluding the species now included in Glebionis.

Glebionis species have been hybridized with related Argyranthemum species to create cultivars of garden marguerites.

Species
Glebionis coronaria (syn. Chrysanthemum coronarium) – crown daisy - central, + southern Europe
Glebionis segetum (syn. Chrysanthemum segetum) – Corn Marigold - northern, central, + southern Europe

Formerly placed here
Ismelia carinata, as Glebionis carinata – tricolor daisy

References

Germplasm Resources Information Network: Glebionis
International Code of Botanical Nomenclature: List of conserved genera (scroll down for Chrysanthemum)

Asteraceae genera
Glebionidinae
Taxa named by Henri Cassini